Cheenavala is a 1975 Indian Malayalam-language film, produced and directed by Kunchacko. The film stars Prem Nazir, Jayabharathi, K. P. A. C. Lalitha and Adoor Bhasi. The film has musical score and songs composed by M. K. Arjunan.

Cast
 
Prem Nazir as Pushkaran 
Jayabharathi as Pennaal 
K. P. A. C. Lalitha as Maanikki 
Adoor Bhasi as Pappu 
Thikkurissy Sukumaran Nair as Richman Rana 
Pattom Sadan as Mohan 
Sankaradi as Konthi 
Adoor Pankajam as Karthyayani 
Janardanan as Rowdi Paachan 
K. P. Ummer as Prathapachandran 
Kunchan as Madhu 
Kuthiravattam Pappu as Fernandes 
Meena as Paaru 
Nellikode Bhaskaran as Ayyappan 
 Arur Sathyan
Sathi as sheela
T. S. Radhamani

Soundtrack

References

External links
  
 

1975 films
1970s Malayalam-language films